NWA By Any Means Necessary, part of the NWA Pop-Up Event series, was a professional wrestling supercard produced by the National Wrestling Alliance (NWA) in conjunction with Tried-N-True Pro Wrestling. The event took place on October 24, 2021, at the Valor Hall in Oak Grove, Kentucky. Matches from the event were taped for episodes of NWA Power, which aired on November 2 and 9 on FITE TV.

Production

Storylines
The event featured professional wrestling matches that involved different wrestlers from pre-existing scripted feuds and storylines. Wrestlers portrayed heroes, villains, or less distinguishable characters in scripted events that built tension and culminated in a wrestling match or series of matches. Storylines were produced during the sixth season of the NWA's weekly web series, Powerrr.

At NWA 73, Jax Dane attacked his War Kings tag team partner Crimson before the latter's hardcore triple threat match with Thom Latimer and Tim Storm. Two weeks later on Powerrr, the former partners participated in a slap fight hosted by NWA Worlds Heavyweight Champion Trevor Murdoch. However, Dane would soon punch instead of slap Crimson in the face, causing a scuffle between the two. On September 17, in the announcement of By Any Means Necessary, it was announced that Crimson and Dane would wrestle in a Steel Cage match to main event the show.

Results

References

External links

2021 in professional wrestling
2021 in Kentucky
Events in Kentucky
Professional wrestling in Kentucky
June 2021 events in the United States
National Wrestling Alliance shows